Lord Howe Island Airport  is an airport providing air transportation to Lord Howe Island. The airport is operated by the Lord Howe Island Board.

Light aircraft transit
Lord Howe Island (along with Norfolk Island) is an important transit and refueling point for light aircraft flying between Australia and New Zealand. These countries are within the range of many light aircraft when fitted with extra fuel tanks and operating via the two islands, but not while flying directly between them. From New Caledonia, other Pacific nations such as Vanuatu and Fiji are within range and can be used as further 'stepping stones' to other South Pacific and North Pacific destinations.

Facilities

Airlines and destinations

Statistics 

Lord Howe Island Airport served 33,385 revenue passengers during financial year 2009–2010, ranking it 64th amongst airports in Australia.

See also
List of airports in New South Wales

References 

Airports in New South Wales
Lord Howe Island
1974 establishments in Australia